Stadionul Cetate is a multi-purpose stadium in Alba Iulia, Romania. It is currently used mostly for football matches and is the home ground of Unirea Alba Iulia. The stadium holds 18,000 people (8,000 seated).

References

External links
Stadionul Cetate at UnireaFC.ro

Football venues in Romania
Buildings and structures in Alba County
Buildings and structures in Alba Iulia
Multi-purpose stadiums in Romania